Dextrinodontia is a fungal genus in the family Hydnodontaceae. The genus is monotypic, containing the single species Dextrinodontia molliuscula, found in Tanzania.

References

Trechisporales
Fungi of Africa
Monotypic Basidiomycota genera
Trechisporales genera